Rudas Bath or Rudas fürdő is a thermal bath in Budapest, Hungary which is claimed to have medicinal properties. It was first built in 1550, during the time of Ottoman rule. To date, it retains many of the key elements of a Hammam, exemplified by its Ottoman dome and octagonal pool. It is located at Döbrentei tér 9 on the Buda side of Erzsébet Bridge. The components of slightly radioactive thermal water includes sulfate, calcium, magnesium, bicarbonate and a significant amount of fluoride ion. A sight-seeing brochure claims the water can help to treat degenerative joint illnesses, chronic and sub-acute joint inflammations, vertebral disk problems, neuralgia and lack of calcium in the bone system.

The baths were used by Sokollu Mehmed Pasha, governor of Buda Vilayet of the Ottomans between 1566 and 1578. This is inscribed in Hungarian in the baths, on a stone standing atop the Juve spring, which is believed by locals to have a rejuvenating effect on people.

The baths were used as a location for the opening scene of the 1988 action movie Red Heat, starring Arnold Schwarzenegger and James Belushi.

It re-opened at the beginning of 2006, after a comprehensive renovation of its interior.

The baths are open to women only on Tuesdays, to men the rest of the week, and both men and women on the weekend. The attached swimming pool is always open to both men and women.

Gallery

Notes

External links

Budapest Spas and Hot Springs entry on Rudas Baths
Aerial photographs

Ottoman architecture in Hungary
Thermal baths in Budapest
Swimming venues in Hungary